The 2019 Nigerian Senate election in Kebbi State was held on February 23, 2019, to elect members of the Nigerian Senate to represent Kebbi State. Bala Ibn Na'allah representing Kebbi South, Adamu Aliero representing Kebbi Central and Abdullahi Abubakar Yahaya representing Kebbi North all won on the platform of All Progressives Congress.

Overview

Summary

Results

Kebbi South 
A total of 9 candidates registered with the Independent National Electoral Commission to contest in the election. APC candidate Bala Ibn Na'allah won the election, defeating PDP candidate, Benjamin Ezra Dikki and 7 other party candidates. Na'allah scored 136,287 votes, while  PDP candidate Dikki scored 62,733 votes.

Kebbi Central 
A total of 24 candidates registered with the Independent National Electoral Commission to contest in the election. APC candidate Adamu Aliero won the election, defeating PDP candidate Abubakar Shehu-Abubakar and 22 other party candidates. Aliero pulled 232,000 votes, while PDP candidate Abubakar scored 75,638.

Kebbi North 
A total of 15 candidates registered with the Independent National Electoral Commission to contest in the election. APC candidate Abdullahi Abubakar Yahaya won the election, defeating PDP candidate, Usman Bello Suru. Yahaya pulled 170,624 votes while his closest rival Suru pulled 66,815 votes.

References 

Kebbi State senatorial elections
Kebbi State Senate elections